Rainford High Sixth Form is a sixth form college and the post-16 provision of Rainford High School, located in Rainford, St Helens, Merseyside.

The first A-Level exam to be sat at Rainford was sat in 1962, with the first student to enter University from Rainford in 1966.

The Sixth Form building was completed in 1982 and refurbished in 2011. During this process, the Sixth Form was moved into temporary accommodation on one of the fields on the school's grounds.

It is currently third in the results table in the St Helens area, behind Hope Academy and Carmel College. However, due to the COVID-19 pandemic, exam data from the years 2020 and 2021 has not been released. Exam data is expected to be released from the summer 2022 exam cohort.

The college is based in the grounds of Rainford High School.

The Sixth Form has some specialist facilities, such as a media suite with video editing facilities, and a canteen, however, many of the school's other facilities, such as Science Labs, the Auditourium, and the Sports Hall, are shared with the main school.

Houses 
The Sixth Form shares its houses with the main school, those being Compassion, Integrity, Determination, Endevaour, and Resilience. Each student and member of staff will be randomly placed into one of the five houses, and will be given a lanyard that matches this house.

References

External links
Rainford College

Sixth form colleges in Merseyside
Sixth Form
Schools in St Helens, Merseyside